is a passenger railway station located in Higashi-ku in the city of Okayama, Okayama Prefecture, Japan. It is operated by the West Japan Railway Company (JR West).

Lines

Station layout
The station consists of one side platform and one island platform connected by a footbridge. The station is staffed..

Adjacent stations

History
Saidaiji Station was opened on 1 September 1962. With the privatization of Japanese National Railways (JNR) on 1 April 1987, the station came under the control of JR West.

Passenger statistics
In fiscal 2019, the station was used by an average of 3631 passengers daily

Surrounding area
Okayama City Higashi Ward Office
Okayama Municipal Saidaiji Elementary School
Okayama Prefectural Saidaiji High School

See also
List of railway stations in Japan

References

External links

 JR West Station Official Site

Railway stations in Okayama
Akō Line
Railway stations in Japan opened in 1962